Den thelo na thimame (Greek: Δεν θέλω να θυμάμαι) is the name of a studio album by popular Greek singer Tolis Voskopoulos. It was released in December 1982 by Columbia/Minos EMI in Greece. This album was issued in mono and stereo. The stereo version of this album was released on CD in the 1990s by EMI.

Track listing 

Side One.
 "Den thelo na thimame" - (Nikos Lavranos-Varvara Tsimpouli) - 3:12 - (Greek: Δεν θέλω να θυμάμαι)
 "Egine ki' afto" feat. Marinella - (Tolis Voskopoulos) - 3:39 - (Greek: Έγινε κι' αυτό)
 "Ximeroma Savvato" - (Nikos Tzavaras-Sophie Pappa) - 3:00 - (Greek: Ξημέρωμα Σάββατο)
 "Ki' evala ta klamata" - (Tolis Voskopoulos-Sophie Pappa) - 2:31 - (Greek: Κι' έβαλα τα κλάματα)
 "Pios eim' ego" - (Tolis Voskopoulos-Maro Bizani) - 2:44 - (Greek: Ποιος είμ' εγώ)
 "Ehthes mou tilefonises" - (Tolis Voskopoulos-Sophie Pappa) - 3:10 - (Greek: Εχθές μου τηλεφώνησες)
 "Esy pou irthes" - (Tolis Voskopoulos) - 2:41 - (Greek: Εσύ που ήρθες)
Side Two.
 "Mavra matia" - (Tolis Voskopoulos-Maro Bizani) - 3:15 - (Greek: Μαύρα μάτια)
 "Hthes akoma" feat. Marinella - (Nikos Tzavaras-Sophie Pappa) - 3:12 - (Greek: Χθες ακόμα)
 "Matia mou thalassina" feat. Marinella - (Nikos Lavranos-Varvara Tsimpouli) - 2:55 - (Greek: Μάτια μου θαλασσινά)
 "Archise na vrechi" - (Tolis Voskopoulos-Sophie Pappa) - 2:38 - (Greek: Άρχισε να βρέχει)
 "Ta onira mou" - (Tolis Voskopoulos-Maro Bizani) - 3:04 - (Greek: Τα όνειρά μου)
 "Den thelo na thimame (Instrumental)" - (Nikos Lavranos-Varvara Tsimpouli) - 3:12 - (Greek: Δεν θέλω να θυμάμαι)

Personnel 
 Tolis Voskopoulos - vocals, background vocals
 Marinella - background vocals
 Giorgos Petsilas - producer
 Nikos Lavranos - arranger, conductor
 Yiannis Smyrneos - recording engineer
 Alinta Mavrogeni – photographer
 Dimitris Th. Arvanitis - artwork

References

1982 albums
Tolis Voskopoulos albums
Greek-language albums
Minos EMI albums